The Moondancers are a fictional DC Comics team of radical pacifist terrorists. They first appeared in  World's Finest Comics #295 (September 1983), and were created by David A Kraft, L.B. Kellog and Jerome K. Moore.

Publication history

The Moondancers are radical pacifist terrorists who go about sabotaging military satellites and weapons installations in a misguided attempt to end all wars. Batman was brought in to investigate the scene of one of their assaults. The next time the Moondancers attempt to prevent the launch of a military communications satellite, Batman attempts to stop them and is nearly killed, causing Superman to be summoned.

During a clash with Superman and Batman, the mysterious benefactor of the Moondancers is revealed to be a Japanese scientist named Nakamura, a survivor of Hiroshima who was unhinged by the event. Nakamura is badly wounded after a failed attempt to destroy the satellite himself.

According to the Moondancers they only employ violence in order to bring about world peace, a credo they share with Wonder Woman. Batman and Superman let the trio go, because as Batman says "We can't condone their methods.. but we can't condemn them for their goals...".

The Moondancers were last seen in Animal Man #25 (July 1990).

Membership
 Crescent Moon – Silver haired woman who uses gravity manipulation to control and levitate the flying platform.
 Harvest Moon – A muscular redhead with the power to increase her size and commensurate strength.
 New Moon – An African-American woman who uses cold manipulation to fire blasts of intensely cold dark energy.

Notes
Other lunar-themed women in DC Comics are:
 Blue Moon, a mercenary occultist hired to kill Ragman, her powers wax and wane with the moon. First appears in Shadowpact #6 (December 2006). 
 Lady Lunar, an enemy of Superman. First appears in Wonder Woman series 1 #252 (February 1979).
 Moonbow, an ally of Green Arrow. First appears in Fury of Firestorm #48 (June 1986).
 Moon Maiden, member of the Justice League. First appears in JLA Giant Size Special #3 (October 2000).
 Mother Moon, a matronly member of the Siren Sisterhood that protects the Microcosmos. She has healing powers. First appears in JLA series 1 #213 (April 1983).

References

External links
Cosmic Teams: Moondancers

DC Comics supervillain teams
Fictional pacifists
1983 comics debuts
Comics characters introduced in 1983